The British Rail Class 196 Civity is a class of diesel multiple unit built for West Midlands Trains by Spanish rolling stock manufacturer CAF. A total of 26 units have been built; 12 two-car units and 14 four-car units.

They are the first train of the Civity family to feature end gangways.

History
Shortly after the announcement that a consortium of Abellio, Mitsui and JR East had been awarded the West Midlands franchise, West Midlands Trains confirmed they had placed an order for 26 diesel multiple units based on CAF's Civity platform.

The first completed unit started testing at the Velim railway test circuit in December 2019.

The first vehicle arrived at Tyseley TMD in Birmingham on 17 April 2020, having travelled by ship from Cuxhaven to Hull. Revenue services using the new fleet began on 17 October 2022, on services between Shrewsbury and Birmingham.

Operators

West Midlands Trains
West Midlands Trains will use the Class 196 fleet to replace their 23 Class 170/5 Turbostar units on services between Birmingham and Shrewsbury via Telford. They will also run on Birmingham to Hereford services from 2023, with occasional appearances on the Snow Hill Lines (Dorridge & Stratford-upon-Avon to Worcester). Six 2-car units will be allocated to the initial services operated on the East West Rail route between Oxford and Milton Keynes.

Fleet details

Vehicle numbering
Individual vehicles are numbered in the ranges as follows, with the last three digits of each vehicle number matching those of the unit to which the vehicle belongs:

European Vehicle Numbers for the fleet are devised by prefixing the domestic vehicle number with type code 95, country code 70, and a leading zero; "95700...".

Named units
Unit 196001 is named Graiseley Wolves.
Unit 196101 is named Charles Darwin.

See also
 British Rail Class 195 - A diesel multiple unit variant of the CAF Civity UK platform built for Northern.
 British Rail Class 197 - A diesel multiple unit variant of the CAF Civity UK platform built for Transport for Wales Rail.
 British Rail Class 331 - An electric multiple unit variant of the CAF Civity UK platform also built for Northern.

Notes

References

External links

195
CAF multiple units
Train-related introductions in 2022